"On My Way" is a song by Swedish dance music duo Axwell & Ingrosso. The song was released in Sweden on 12 March 2015 as the second single from their debut studio album More Than You Know. The song was written by Sebastian Ingrosso, Salem Al Fakir, Axel Hedfors, Vincent Pontare. The song peaked at number 18 on the Swedish Singles Chart.

Usage in media
The song appeared in the opening sequence for ESPN's coverage of the 2015 World Series of Poker.

Music video
A music video to accompany the release of "On My Way" was first released onto YouTube on 12 March 2015 at a total length of six minutes and fifty-one seconds. As of June 2016, it has received over 8 million views.

Track listing

Charts

Weekly charts

Year-end charts

Certifications

Release history

References

2014 songs
2015 singles
Songs written by Axwell
Songs written by Sebastian Ingrosso
Songs written by Vincent Pontare
Songs written by Salem Al Fakir
Axwell & Ingrosso songs